Adiel Arthur Paananen (January 3, 1897 – July 25, 1968) was a Finnish cross-country skier in the late 1920s and early 1930s.

He was born and died in Saarijärvi.

At the 1928 Winter Olympics he competed in the 50 km event but did not finish.

Paananen won a bronze medal at the 1930 FIS Nordic World Ski Championships in the 50 km.

Cross-country skiing results
All results are sourced from the International Ski Federation (FIS).

Olympic Games

World Championships
 1 medal – (1 bronze)

References

External links

1897 births
1968 deaths
People from Saarijärvi
People from Vaasa Province (Grand Duchy of Finland)
Finnish male cross-country skiers
Olympic cross-country skiers of Finland
Cross-country skiers at the 1928 Winter Olympics
FIS Nordic World Ski Championships medalists in cross-country skiing
Sportspeople from Central Finland
20th-century Finnish people